Radivilias is a Latin epic poem by Jonas Radvanas published in 1592. It is one of the major works of the 16th-century Lithuanian literature and one of the best examples of Renaissance literature in Lithuania. It uses hexameter and has 3,302 lines divided into four parts. It is dedicated to Mikołaj "the Red" Radziwiłł (1512–1584) and his major military victories in the Livonian War.

Content
The poem is dedicated to Mikołaj "the Red" Radziwiłł (1512–1584) and his major military victories in the Livonian War – capture of the Tarvastu Castle in 1561, Battle of Wenden in 1578, Siege of Polotsk in 1579, Siege of Velikiye Luki in 1580, and his largest victory in the Battle of Ula in 1564. Similarly to the legendary Aeneas, Radziwiłł fulfills his destiny by protecting and defending Lithuania from the Tsardom of Russia and receives a prophetic instruction from Musaeus of Athens. At Ula, Radziwiłł is guided by a vision of Grand Duke Vytautas (ruled 1392–1430) and draws inspiration from his victory in the Battle of Grunwald in 1410. At the same time, the poem vilifies Lithuania's greatest enemy Ivan the Terrible. While the goal of the poem was to promote and glorify Radziwiłł and the Grand Duchy, it also provides some valuable historical details. For example, Radziwiłł's year of birth (1512) is known only from the poem.

However, the poem goes beyond a simple panegyric and paints a broader patriotic image of the Grand Duchy of Lithuania, its history, geography, and culture. Lithuania is presented as a powerful and wealthy country. Radvanas traced the lineage of Lithuanian rulers to the legendary Palemonid dynasty which hailed from the Roman Empire and included other patriotic legends (such as the legend about the Grand Duke Gediminas dream of the Iron Wolf) from the Lithuanian Chronicles and the history of Lithuania by Maciej Stryjkowski. It also subtly supported Lithuania's geopolitical aspirations. For example, Dnieper river which flows through the territory that was transferred to Poland by the Union of Lublin in 1569 was mentioned as a river of Lithuania. Similarly, Daugava in Livonia (territory at the center of the Livonian War) was also mentioned as Lithuania's. In the poem, in his deathbed Radziwiłł prays to God asking for glory and scepter for Lithuania – a hint at the desire to break the Union of Lublin and for the Grand Duchy to become independent Kingdom of Lithuania.

Radvanas followed and borrowed from Roman literature, and in particular from Virgil's Aeneid. For example, he borrowed the idea to describe the entire history of Lithuania in the Radziwiłł's shield from Aeneid.

Publication and reception
The work was commissioned by Jan Abramowicz, one of Radziwiłł's political allies and later Voivode of Smolensk. The poem was first published in 1592 in Vilnius together with several other Latin works by Andreas Volanus, and others. In 1580s and 1590s, there were several works published that glorified military achievements of the Radziwiłł family.

The first critical evaluation of Radviliana was published in 1747 by the librarian of Józef Andrzej Załuski. At the time, it was described as a mere panegyric with no new or clear ideas. Such critical evaluations were repeated by various authors until mid-20th century when historian reevaluated the poem's historical context and artistic merit.

There are eight known surviving copies of Radivilias. The only copy in Lithuania is kept by the library of the Lithuanian Academy of Sciences and was originally owned by Kazimierz Leon Sapieha (1609–1656). The poem was translated into Lithuanian language as Radviliada by the literary historian  in 1997. Since then, the poem has been added to the high school curriculum in Lithuania. In 2015, film Radivilias which was described as "cinematic journey" as it mixed different genres (drama, documentary, behind the scenes) highlighted some of the key episodes from the lives of Mikołaj "the Red" Radziwiłł, Mikołaj "the Black" Radziwiłł, and Mikołaj Krzysztof "the Orphan" Radziwiłł and traced some of their descendants in the present day.

The poem was translated into Italian language by the scholar Simone Carboni in 2022.

References

Bibliography

External links 
 Original Radviliada at Internet Archive
 Excerpts from Radviliada (translation to Lithuanian by Sigitas Narbutas)

1590s poems
1592 works
Epic poems in Latin
Radziwiłł family
Lithuanian poems
Polish poems
1590s in Poland
16th-century Latin books